Rigoberto Fuentes Peat (born January 4, 1944) is a retired professional baseball player. He played for 13 seasons in the major leagues between 1965 and 1978, primarily as a second baseman. Fuentes played for most of his career with the San Francisco Giants.

Professional career
The Giants initially signed Fuentes as an 18-year-old amateur before the start of the 1962 season. He was one of the last baseball players signed directly out of Cuba before the United States embargo against Cuba. Fuentes made his major league debut on August 18, 1965. Four days later, he was involved in one of the most famous baseball fights in history, a 14-minute brawl between the Giants and Los Angeles Dodgers in which Juan Marichal bloodied John Roseboro with a bat; Fuentes, the on-deck hitter when the fight broke out, brandished his own bat as he rushed to join the fray, though he did not hit anyone with it. Fuentes split time between second base and shortstop as a rookie in 1966. He batted .261 in his maiden year while playing solid defense at both positions. He slumped to batting .209 the following year, and subsequently, he spent all of 1968 in the minor leagues.

Fuentes returned to the Giants in 1969 and spent the next two seasons as a utility infielder before re-gaining his starting spot at second base in 1971. He appeared in the postseason during the 1971 season as his Giants won the NL West title; his two-run home run in Game 1 of the 1971 NLCS helped San Francisco take an early series lead against the Pittsburgh Pirates, but that would turn out to be the Giants' only win of the best-of-five series. Fuentes continued to be the Giants' second baseman for three more seasons. In 1973, he set a National League record by recording a .993 fielding percentage, the highest for any regular second baseman in league history. Ironically, Fuentes had led all National League second basemen in errors during the previous two seasons before setting the new record for excellence. His record stood for 13 seasons before Ryne Sandberg recorded a .994 percentage at second in 1986.

He was dealt along with Butch Metzger from the Giants to the Padres for Derrel Thomas at the Winter Meetings on December 6, 1974. Fuentes played for two seasons in San Diego before leaving as a free agent. In 1977, Fuentes played with the Detroit Tigers and had a career-best .309 batting average. Despite having his best season, he was not brought back in 1978 (since the Tigers had a young Lou Whitaker waiting in the wings). The Montreal Expos then purchased his contract. Before the start of the season, however, Fuentes was released. During the year, he signed with the Oakland Athletics, but he was released again after batting just .140 in only 13 games. He played for the Santo Domingo Azucareros in the short-lived Inter-American League in 1979 before retiring.

In Willie Mays's May 14, 1972 debut game at Shea Stadium with the New York Mets, Fuentes of the visiting Giants had a single, two doubles, a home run, and a base on balls in five plate appearances.

Baseball 

Fuentes played baseball with elan, style and flair. He pioneered the use of headbands, sometimes applying them on the outside of his baseball cap. He would approach the plate holding his bat by the barrel, tap it handle-first off the plate, flip it into the air and catch it by the handle, ready to hit. He was called "one of the most renowned hot dogs in baseball history" in Sparky Lyle's 1979 book The Bronx Zoo. Elan and flair was not always accepted by staid ballplayers. Pitchers would knock him down with inside pitches for no apparent reason.  After one such event he came out with a great quote: "They shouldn't throw at me," Fuentes said. "I'm the father of five or six kids."

Broadcasting career
Fuentes returned to the Giants as a radio announcer in 1981, the team's first year of Spanish language radio broadcasts, initially serving in this role until 1992. In 2004, Fuentes was brought back as an analyst, and he remains with the team in this role today. Tito Fuentes was inducted into the Hispanic Heritage Baseball Museum Hall of Fame on February 23, 2002 in San Francisco, California.

References

External links
, or Retrosheet
Pura Pelota (Venezuelan Winter League)

1944 births
Living people
Decatur Commodores players
Detroit Tigers players
El Paso Sun Kings players
Lakeland Giants players
Major League Baseball players from Cuba
Cuban expatriate baseball players in the United States
Major League Baseball second basemen
Navegantes del Magallanes players
Cuban expatriate baseball players in Venezuela
Oakland Athletics players
Phoenix Giants players
Salem Rebels players
San Diego Padres players
San Francisco Giants announcers
San Francisco Giants players
Santo Domingo Azucareros players
Baseball players from Havana
Tacoma Giants players